Maha Laziri (born 1991) is a Moroccan education activist.
 She is the founder of the NGO Teach4Morocco. In 2014 Arabian Business ranked her 17th in their list of the 100 most powerful Arab women.

References

1991 births
Living people
Social entrepreneurs
Moroccan activists
Moroccan women activists
Education activists